Croatia participated at the 2010 Winter Olympics in Vancouver, British Columbia, Canada. The Croatian delegation consisted of nineteen athletes in four sports.

Medalists

Alpine skiing 

Croatia qualified ten alpine skiers. Ivica Kostelić was the only athlete able to medal, winning two silver medals.
Men

Women

Biathlon 

Croatia qualified two biathletes, one man and one woman. Jakov Fak became the first Croatian to win a medal outside of alpine skiing, and also became the first Croatian Winter Olympic medalist who was not from the Kostelić family.

Men

Women

Bobsleigh 

* Mezulić competed in runs 1 and 2, while Haklits competed in runs 3 and 4.

Cross-country skiing 

Men

Women

See also
 Croatia at the Olympics
 Croatia at the 2010 Winter Paralympics

References

Further reading

External links
 Vancouver 2010 Olympics at Sportnet.hr

2010 in Croatian sport
Nations at the 2010 Winter Olympics
2010